The 2000 World Junior Championships in Athletics were held in Santiago, Chile between 17 and 22 October 2000.

Results

Men

Women

Medal table

Participation
According to an unofficial count through an unofficial result list, 1122 athletes from 151 countries participated in the event.  This is in agreement with the official numbers as published.

References

External links
Official site (archived)
Official results

 
World Athletics U20 Championships
World Junior Championships in Athletics
World Junior Championships in Athletics
Sports competitions in Santiago
International athletics competitions hosted by Chile
October 2000 sports events in South America
2000s in Santiago, Chile